Brick House or brickhouse may refer to:

 A brick house
Brickhouse (surname)

Business
 BrickHouse Security, an American security company
 Brickhouse Direct, an e-commerce company founded by musician Jim Brickman

Music
 "Brick House" (song), a 1977 single by the Commodores
 Brick House (EP), a 1997 EP by Saukrates

Properties

Australia
Brickhouse Station, a pastoral lease in Western Australia

Nigeria
 Government House, Port Harcourt, Nigeria, also known as Brick House

United Kingdom
 Brick House (London), listed for the 2006 Sterling prize for architecture

United States
(by state)
 The Brick House, Louisville, Kentucky
 Brick House on the Pike, listed on the NRHP in Howard County, Maryland
 Brick House (Cazenovia, New York), listed on the National Register of Historic Places (NRHP), in Oneida County
 Old Brick House, listed on the NRHP in Pasquotank County, North Carolina
 Brick House (Clifford, Virginia), NRHP-listed
 Brick House (White Plains, Virginia), listed on the NRHP in Brunswick County, Virginia

Other
 Brick House (cigar), a brand of cigars
 Brick House (sculpture), a statue in Manhattan and the University of Pennsylvania campus
 Brickhouse Brown (1960-2018), an American professional wrestler